Miloš Grlica (born 3 January 1979) is a Paralympic retired athlete from Serbia competing mainly in category F12 javelinand pentathlon events.

He entered the secondary school for children with special needs ˝Veljko Ramadanović˝ in Zemun, Belgrade, because of the problems with his eyesight. Grlica entered the field of sports when he was 11 years old. He then graduated from the medical high school, department for Physiotherapy for physiotherapists with impaired eyesight. Then he graduated athletics coach and goalball coach on Faculty of Sport and Physical Education, University of Niš.

He has been a member of the sport representation of the Federal Republic of Yugoslavia, then the State Union of Serbia and Montenegro and finally of the Republic of Serbia since 1995. So far, he participated in six World Para Athletics Championships and World Para Athletics European Championships, three Balkans game events and four Paralympic Games. As already mentioned, Miloš's specialty is F12 category javelin. In 2016. Miloš has been retired from professional athletics sport.
The most important Grlica's achievements in competitions are: 
 2004 – bronze medal at the 2004 Summer Paralympics
 2005 – gold medal at 2005 IPC Athletics European Championships in Finland
 2007 – bronze medal at the World Championship for athletes with visual impairment in São Paulo, Brasil
 2011 – bronze medal, including the setting of his personal as well as the new European record of 60.81 meters at 2011 IPC Athletics World Championships in New Zealand
 2011 – silver medal at the World Championship for visual impaired athletes in Anatolia, Turkey
 2012 – gold medal at 2012 IPC Athletics European Championships in the Netherlands
 2014 – silver medal at 2014 IPC Athletics European Championships in Wales
 2015 Miloš starts with revie in goalball sport in Serbia as coach and also as organiser. His first assistant in goalball team is Dragan Sremčević, goalball coach, the world goalball legend, winner of Paralympic bronze in 1984. in New York, also winner gold medal at Paralympic games in Seoul 1988. Dragan has been a few times first in Europe and also in the world in goalball. Dragan was proclaimed best player in this competitions. Miloš also have big support for this huge project of revevel goalball sport in Serbia from Faculty of Sport and Physical Education, University of Niš, Serbia.

Miloš Grlica has been declared the best sportsman of the city of Beograd consecutively in 2003, 2004, 2005. and 2007. He has also been declared the sportsman of the year 2004. and 2005. of the State Union of Serbia and Montenegro. Grlica is the bearer of the National Sport Merits Award and had received the May Award of the Serbian Sport Union. Miloš is married and has two children.

References

 

Paralympic athletes of Serbia and Montenegro
Paralympic athletes of Serbia
Athletes (track and field) at the 2000 Summer Paralympics
Athletes (track and field) at the 2004 Summer Paralympics
Athletes (track and field) at the 2008 Summer Paralympics
Paralympic bronze medalists for Serbia and Montenegro
Living people
Medalists at the 2004 Summer Paralympics
1979 births
Paralympic medalists in athletics (track and field)
Serbian male javelin throwers
Visually impaired javelin throwers
Paralympic javelin throwers
Medalists at the World Para Athletics European Championships